Siriporn Thaweesuk (often known by her name in the ring, Samson) (born 26 April 1983) is a female light-flyweight boxing champion (western boxing, not Muay Thai), from Lopburi Province, Thailand.

Thaweesuk won the title while serving a prison sentence, and was granted an early release from Thai prison after winning a world title, having been promised such prior to her victory. Originally a ten-year sentence, Thaweesuk served seven years.

She defeated Japan's Ayaka Miyao in a title fight, which was held in a prison yard boxing ring.

References

Living people
Siriporn Thaweesuk
Siriporn Thaweesuk
Light-flyweight boxers
1983 births